Tehkal is a town  in Peshawar, Pakistan.

References 

Populated places in Peshawar District